Matchoi Bobó Djaló (born 10 April 2003) is a professional footballer who plays as a midfielder for Paços de Ferreira. Born in Guinea-Bissau, he represents Portugal internationally.

Career
On 10 August 2019, Djaló made his debut for Paços de Ferreira, coming on as a 72nd-minute substitute for Pedrinho Moreira in a 5–0 loss away to reigning champions Benfica. At the age of 16 years and 122 days, he was the youngest player ever to play in the Primeira Liga.

Personal life
Djaló is the son of the retired footballer Bobó Djalo.

Career statistics

References

External links
Profile at Liga Portuguesa de Futebol Profissional

2003 births
Living people
Portuguese footballers
Portugal youth international footballers
Bissau-Guinean footballers
Portuguese people of Bissau-Guinean descent
Bissau-Guinean emigrants to Portugal
Association football midfielders
F.C. Paços de Ferreira players
Primeira Liga players